The 2003–04 season was Adelaide United FC's inaugural season since its establishment in 2003.

Review
Despite the rush to form the team, and starting five weeks into the season (the first four rounds of matches were squeezed in later in the season), the team lost just twice in its first 13 matches. Hectic catch up phases in November and December (7 matches in 31 days for 4 wins and 3 draws) and February (6 matches in 24 days for 4 wins and 2 losses) passed by with success. Aside from the debut win over Brisbane, regular season highlights included a 2–1 away win over Parramatta Power, a resounding 2–0 home victory against South Melbourne, and a 1–0 win over an in-form Marconi and the effective sealing of third spot.

Despite the high position, many people expected the wheels to fall off in the finals. But the finals phase served up two more fairytale results. Everything came together for the first leg of the Elimination Final, and the 3–0 win over the Brisbane Strikers was the team's first win by more than two goals. The roller coaster ride passed deep into a trough the following week in Brisbane with a 4–1 loss – but United won the Elimination Final over all due to the away goals rule, progressing to the Minor Semi-Final versus South Melbourne. This attracted the club's largest ever crowd, officially 16,558, in a tough win on penalties. The team was then outclassed by the eventual premiers, Perth Glory, 5–0 at Subiaco Oval in the Preliminary Final.

Built up from the core of Adelaide City's 2002–03 squad, the Adelaide United team forged ahead with a burgeoning team spirit that became their signature attribute. The previous season's Adelaide City players Mike Valkanis, Aaron Goulding, Kristian Rees and captain Aurelio Vidmar merged superbly with the return to Adelaide of Alagich (from Brisbane), Aloisi (Italy)  and others to form an outfit which performed consistently all season. Coach John Kosmina, also returning after 25 years to his home city, is a clear favourite of the fans.

With the winding-down of the NSL, the team has become a founding member of the A-League.

Players

Transfers

Transfers in

Transfers out

Squad statistics

Appearances and goals

{| class="wikitable sortable plainrowheaders" style="text-align:center"
|-
! rowspan="2" |
! rowspan="2" |
! rowspan="2" style="width:180px;" |Name
! colspan="2" style="width:180px;" |National Soccer League
! colspan="2" style="width:180px;" |National Soccer League Finals
! colspan="2" style="width:180px;" |Total
|-
!
!Goals
!
!Goals
!
!Goals
|-
|1
|GK
! scope="row" | David Scarsella

|20
|0

|4
|0

!24
!0
|-
|2
|DF
! scope="row" | Richie Alagich

|24
|2

|4
|1

!28
!3
|-
|4
|DF
! scope="row" | Aaron Goulding

|24
|0

|4
|0

!28
!0
|-
|5
|DF
! scope="row" | Michael Valkanis

|20+1
|1

|4
|0

!25
!1
|-
|7
|MF
! scope="row" | David Terminello

|8+8
|1

|3
|0

!19
!1
|-
|8
|MF
! scope="row" | Carl Veart

|23
|10

|4
|2

!27
!12
|-
|9
|FW
! scope="row" | Shane Smeltz

|4+3
|1

|0
|0

!7
!1
|-
|10
|MF
! scope="row" | Aurelio Vidmar

|23
|2

|4
|0

!27
!2
|-
|11
|MF
! scope="row" | Goran Lozanovski

|12+2
|0

|0
|0

!14
!0
|-
|12
|MF
! scope="row" | Shane Thompson

|7+4
|1

|1+1
|0

!13
!1
|-
|15
|MF
! scope="row" | Aaron Westervelt

|11+7
|0

|0+3
|0

!23
!0
|-
|16
|FW
! scope="row" | Michael Brooks

|0+5
|2

|0+3
|1

!8
!3
|-
|17
|FW
! scope="row" | Mimi Saric

|5+9
|2

|0
|0

!14
!2
|-
|18
|MF
! scope="row" | Fred Agius

|6+3
|0

|3+1
|1

!13
!1
|-
|19
|FW
! scope="row" | Elias Demourtzidis

|5+6
|0

|0+1
|0

!12
!0
|-
|21
|MF
! scope="row" | Adriano Pellegrino

|7+10
|1

|0
|0

!17
!1
|-
|23
|MF
! scope="row"| Nick Budin

|8+7
|1

|4
|0

!19
!1
|-
|24
|MF
! scope="row"| Matthew Kemp

|8
|1

|2+1
|0

!11
!1
|-
! colspan="14"| Players sold but featured this season
|-
|3
|DF
! scope="row" | Kristian Rees

|23
|0

|3
|0

!26
!0
|-
|6
|MF
! scope="row" | Ross Aloisi

|22
|3

|4
|1

!26
!4
|-
|20
|GK
! scope="row" | Robert Bajic

|4
|0

|0
|0

!4
!0
|-
|—
|FW
! scope="row" | Félix Tagawa

|0
|0

|0
|0

!0
!0
|}

Disciplinary record

Clean sheets

Competitions

Overview

{|class="wikitable" style="text-align:left"
|-
!rowspan=2 style="width:200px;"|Competition
!colspan=8|Record
|-
!style="width:40px;"|
!style="width:40px;"|
!style="width:40px;"|
!style="width:40px;"|
!style="width:40px;"|
!style="width:40px;"|
!style="width:40px;"|
!style="width:70px;"|
|-
|National Soccer League

|-
|National Soccer League Finals

|-
!Total

National Soccer League

League table

Results by Matchday

Matches

N.S.L. Finals Series

References

External links
 Official Website
 OZFootball Website

Adelaide United FC seasons
Adelaide United